A disseisor is the person who has taken adverse possession of real property from the legal owner; ie., who has taken actual possession or occupation of the property without the permission of the legal owner.

Perspective in property law
In property law, the disseisor deprives the legal owner of possession or seisin of an estate in land, thus "dis-seizing" (dispossessing) the legal owner.

A disseisee, the correlative, is the legal owner who has been put out of an estate unlawfully.

See also
Squatting
Property law

References

Real property law
Common law legal terminology